365 Wan Haeng Rak ("365 Days of Love") is drama-romance lakorn that is aired on Channel 3. It stars Theeradeth Wongpuapan and Ann Thongprasom.This is the 5th lakorn that Ken and Ann had been in together.

Synopsis
Tula or Toon (Theeradeth Wongpuapan) is the husband of Lanalee "Lan" (Ann Thongprasom). Tula is very confident in love for Lanalee, but for Lanalee not so much. Lanalee is described as bossy, self-centered, like her character in Sood Sanae Ha as Alin. One day Lanalee goes to a fortune teller or psychic and the psychic tells her that she and Tula will break up and Lanalee didn't believe it, so the psychic gave her an old notebook and instructs her to put it under her pillow when she sleeps and when she wake she'll find out that her divorce with Tula is true. For a while Lanalee is very depressed about the psychic's prediction, but as a result she put the notebook in her pillow and wakes up only to find out that a year ago she and Tula fought a lot where it ended up she packed her things up and move in into her mother's house.

Actors 2010

Theme music

Awards
2010 Top Awards
Best Lakorn - 365 Wan Haeng Rak - Nominated
Best Actress in a Lakorn - Ann Thongprasom - Nominated
Best Actor in a Lakorn - Theeradeth Wonpuapan - Nominated
Best Supporting Actor in a Lakorn - Worarit FuengArum - Nominated
Best Supporting Actress in a Lakorn - Pakkaramai Protranan - Nominated

Channel 3 (Thailand) original programming
Thai romance television series
2010 Thai television series debuts
2010s Thai television series